The third season of Smallville, an American television series, began airing on October 1, 2003. The series recounts the early adventures of Kryptonian Clark Kent as he adjusts to life in the fictional town of Smallville, Kansas, during the years before he becomes Superman. The third season comprises 22 episodes and concluded its initial airing on May 19, 2004. Regular cast members during season three include Tom Welling, Kristin Kreuk, Michael Rosenbaum, Sam Jones III, Allison Mack, John Glover, Annette O'Toole and John Schneider.

Season three follows Clark's constant fight against the destiny that his biological father, Jor-El, has in-store for him, and his guilt over the price Jonathan paid to bring him back to Smallville. Lex deals with the psychological breakdown he had when stranded on a deserted island, while the conflict between him and his father comes to a final blow. Clark's secret begins to weigh heavily on Pete, and the relationship between Clark and Lana hits a dead end. Writers also brought in several DC Comics characters, Maggie Sawyer, Morgan Edge, and most notably Perry White, in special guests spots.

After spending its first two seasons airing on Tuesdays at 9:00 pm (ET), Smallville was moved to Wednesdays and aired at 8:00 pm for the third season. Season three dipped in the ratings, averaging 4.9 million viewers a week.

Episodes

Production
Going into season three, the Smallville crew wanted to establish two main themes, which were the consequences of Clark running from his destiny, and Lex taking steps toward "the dark side". One of the consequences the creative team attempted to show for Clark was his distancing himself from his friends. Season three was also about showing just how evil Lionel is – illustrated by how he attempts to destroy Chloe's life and make Lex believe that he is going insane. In order to get better performances from the actors in each individual episode, the crew would often limit the detail an actor knew about their character. Meeting just at the beginning of the year to discuss the plans for the actor's respective roles, usually the actors would only find out precisely what their characters were going to do when the scripts arrived. Other times, an actor might be given a specific piece of character development and told to keep it a secret from the rest of the cast.

Writing
Series developers Al Gough and Miles Millar wanted to set up Lex's "mental illness" early in the season, as it would be something that Lionel would take advantage of in later episodes of season three. In order to accomplish what they wanted, Gough and Millar introduced Lex's imaginary friend "Louis", who appeared on the deserted island with Lex following his plane crash in the season two finale. They had Rosenbaum pull what they referred to as the "Fight Club gag", where he believes that he is fighting Louis, but in reality he has been fighting himself the entire time. This would culminate in the episode "Shattered", where, as Mark Verheiden explains, the episode was set up like something out of the film Gaslight, where the audience believes that Lex is being driven insane.

The final scene in "Exile", which extended into the opening act of "Phoenix", was the establishment of a storyline that would run the course of the third season, and even extend further into season five. The storyline involved Jonathan making a deal with Clark's biological father, Jor-El, to be given powers strong enough to bring Clark back home; the result was a heart attack for Jonathan later in the season, whose body could not handle the powers. Gough and Millar wanted to be able to provide answers for certain aspects of the Superman mythology, in this case it was Jonathan's heart condition. According to writer/executive producer Mark Verheiden, the idea of having Jonathan suffer a heart attack came to the writing team in season one. The story was almost used in season two's "Fever", but they finally settled on an appropriate story in season three that would tie Jonathan directly to Jor-El when he made a deal to bring Clark home that would eventually lead to a heart attack in the episode "Hereafter".

The writing staff wanted to touch on the fact that even though Clark has all of these powers he cannot save everyone, as well as expanding on the idea of Clark's continual feeling of isolation. "Asylum" served to remind Clark that he cannot save everyone when he fails to stop Lionel from giving Lex electric shock therapy, which ultimately erases seven weeks of Lex's memory that includes his knowledge that Lionel murdered his own parents. Like season two's "Ryan", Clark is faced with the reality that he is not "God", and that he will fail to save people from time to time.

The episode "Forsaken" was designed to set up many of the plot points in the season finale, particularly those dealing with Clark's feeling of isolation, specifically that of Pete and Lana's departure from Smallville. Next to establishing a heart condition for Jonathan, the team also wanted to address the idea of Clark's mortality, or lack-thereof. The concept in "Hereafter" of Clark possibly never dying came from an idea that sprouted after season one's "Hourglass". In "Hourglass", Cassandra Carver, a blind elderly woman who can see the future of the person she touches, shows Clark a future where he is surrounded by the tombstones of everyone he loves. For "Hereafter", Jordan Cross can see the moment of death for anyone he touches; when Jordan touches Clark he does not see Clark's death, only a billowing red cape. According to Verheiden, they wanted to illustrate how Clark's alien heritage put him on a different plane of existence, and allowed him to alter destiny.

The idea to use Superman's cape, which came from Miles Millar, to represent Clark's "cosmic lifespan" came after much discussion on what to actually use. Ideas were thrown around, including a shot of Lex dumping kryptonite on Clark, as he is lying down, killing him. Ultimately they went with Millar's idea, which they saw as this "great iconic moment", because the audience finally sees their first glimpse of Superman's costume. Superman's cape was not the only iconic imagery used during the third season. The episode "Whisper" not only introduced a new superpower for Clark, his super hearing, but allowed the writing staff the opportunity to provide a sort of "in-joke" to the audience. The team wrote in a gag where Clark wears a pair of eyeglasses, a staple of his disguise later in life while working at the Daily Planet. In the episode, an accident with Clark's heat vision causes him to go blind; as his eyes heal, he is forced to wear a pair of prescription eyeglasses until he fully regains his sight. "Perry" would introduce Clark's future boss, and editor of the Daily Planet, Perry White. This episode would also serve as the point where Clark finally learns that his powers are caused by the radiation from Earth's yellow Sun.

Early ideas
Jonathan's heart attack was not the only element that originated during the filming of season one. The use of kryptonite bullets was shelved during season one for a later date because of the limited number of episodes they are able to produce each season, as well as the writers wanting to find "the right moment" to use this particular plot element. They ultimately settled on season three's "Extinction", about a teenager seeking revenge against everyone infected by the meteors. "Extinction" featured a tie-in with a season two episode; Van McNulty's reason for killing meteor-infected individuals is based on the fact that his father was killed by the bone-morphing Tina Greer in "Visage", when she impersonated Whitney Fordman. Van's father was the military personnel that came to the Fordman house to inform Whitney's mother that he had been killed in action. "Relic" was another episode that featured an element first thought up back in the first season, which was the use of the same actors to play both their present-day characters and their characters’ distant relatives in flashback sequences. It was not used because the crew felt that the audience needed to have more time to become involved with the characters that are featured on the show on a regular basis.

"Velocity" also began its life as an idea being tossed around during season one. The team thought about having an episode devoted to small town drag racing, as it was a problem in the Vancouver area while they were filming season one. The story was eventually used in season three, when the writing staff was looking for a reason to exploit the changing friendship between Clark and Pete. According to Verheiden, they wanted a moment where Pete could release his feelings to Clark, and the jealousy he has over Clark spending more time with Lex and Lana. The episode featured the moment when the friendship between Clark and Pete "fractured a bit". "Obsession" featured a scene first thought up in season two's "Visage", which called for the use of lead paint to block the effects of kryptonite on Clark when Tina Greer trapped him in the storm cellar with Lana's kryptonite necklace. The scene was rewritten to have Clark's spaceship save him, and used later in "Obsession", where Clark and Chloe use lead paint to trap the teleporting Alicia Baker.

Story alterations
As the episode development progressed, the writing staff found that not all of their original ideas fit as well as they first thought. When this happens, the staff is forced to change aspects of an episode in order to save time, better develop characters, or stay in line with the rest of the season. For example, in the original script for "Whisper" the thieves who try and rob the jewelry store were going to be father and son. Clark was also originally going to be blind until the end of "Whisper". The team decided that "it wasn’t going to be too satisfying to watch", so Clark received his sight back midway through the episode. The original script for "Velocity" had Clark and Pete playing basketball at the end of the episode, as if nothing had happened. This was revised to have Pete apologize to Clark for forcing him to abuse his powers, and having Clark question whether the two could ever have the same friendship they once had. "Resurrection" originally featured the character of Garrett bonding with Clark over Jonathan's heart condition, as Garrett's father—later changed to his brother—was dying. As the episode progresses, elements of the story were changed and Garrett drifted from being sympathetic to being a darker character who was eventually killed by a police sniper. In the original draft of "Truth", Mrs. Taylor did not reveal that she had been part of an activist group that had done some illegal activity years earlier, but that she was having an affair with a student. As Gough sees it, using the affair storyline would have created more scenes that would need to be shot in order to effectively tell that part of the episode, and using the concept that Mrs. Taylor had been on the run from the law worked easier for the crew.

One of the bigger changes to the season, and the series as a whole, was the character of Pete Ross being written out of the series. The writers had hoped that having Pete know Clark's secret would make him more of a fundamental piece of the show, but it did not. What ultimately happened was that it led to his character becoming increasingly alienated from the other characters, which resulted in his exit from the show. Although there were no real changes to "Talisman", Gough has stated that he wishes they could go back and redo aspects of the episode, because it failed to provide an "entry point". He believes that if someone had not been watching the show previously, they would not have been able to follow the story; to the random observer the episode was simply about two men, Lionel Luthor and Joseph Willowbrook, searching for an ancient dagger. The episode lacked elements that would bring in a younger audience. Simply speaking, it was "too mythologized".

Filming

Directing debut
Season three saw the directing debut of one of the show's developers, Miles Millar, who got to direct the episode "Memoria". Welling describes Millar's style as very succinct, to which he credits to Millar's background of writing for all of the characters on the show. As Welling explains, Millar managed to capture the same effect as other directors, but with fewer words. Millar's visual style, at least for this episode, tended to lean more to applying "extreme lighting" to the scenes, to create silhouettes of the characters. Miles Millar was inspired by the film Kings Row when he filmed the scene for Lex's birthday party as a child. In the scene, a camera pulls back from a flashback transition to reveal a young Lex sitting alone at a large table full of food and gifts. Instead of using the same techniques that were employed in previous episodes for transitioning between the present and the past, Millar decided to shift between the two time frames by transitioning between the older Lex and the younger Lex. This required Rosenbaum to rely more on Millar's direction, so that the emotional level was matched between himself and the young actor portraying Lex, Wayne Dalglish. One particular scene seemed to provide Millar with the most trouble, mainly because of the constraints of the film division at Warner Bros. In the scene, Jor-El and Lara are placing the infant Kal-El into his spaceship during Krypton's final moments. At the time, Warner Bros. was working on a new Superman film, and it was going to be an origin story. This affected how much Smallville could actually show. The film department prohibited Millar from showing Krypton, or Jor-El and Lara. As a result, Millar took inspiration from a comic book written by Jeph Loeb. In Loeb's book, Jor-El and Lara are depicted as just a pair of hands holding on to each other after they place Kal-El into his spaceship.

Last minute changes
As production commences, occasionally the filmmakers find that they have to make last minutes changes to the episode in order to explain certain situations better, or because a better idea came along after they were finished. Sometimes, these last minutes changes will happen shortly before an episode is broadcast. The opening teaser for "Exile" was added approximately one week before the episode aired. The crew wanted to show Clark having fun with his powers while he was on red kryptonite, and the opening they filmed did not illustrate that well enough. The original opening featured Clark buying a car; the new opening showed how he acquired the money to buy the car, which involved him robbing several ATMs. The crew reshot the final scene in "Truth" between Clark and Chloe, where Chloe apologizes for trying to use her recently acquired ability to get the truth out of anyone to dig into Clark's past. Originally, Clark did not accept her apology, but the crew felt that was too strong, especially since she was under the influence of kryptonite, so they refilmed it with Clark accepting her apology.

The final moment in "Crisis", of Lionel preparing to kill himself, was also added at the last minute. John Glover and the crew filmed the scene during the filming of "Memoria", which occurred a week before "Crisis" was going to air. While filming, Greg Beeman, James Marshall and Miles Millar were all sitting behind the monitors, trying to come up with the cliffhanger ending that was going to be attached to "Crisis". Beeman added the moment where the phone rings, interrupting Lionel from completing his suicide; this was used as the opening for "Legacy" and it all eventually set up Lionel's terminal liver disease. Another late change, though it was not at the last minute, came for Lionel's physical appearance on the show. John Glover came up with the idea of cutting Lionel's hair for the season finale. Glover was busy preparing for a play that he was going to be acting in, and he needed his hair cut for the part. Glover made the suggestion while the crew was filming "Memoria", as well as the idea of setting the scene in prison. Gough admits to needing some kind of device to cut back to while all of the other cliffhangers are occurring—Clark being taken away, the Kryptonian symbol burned into field on the Kent farm, and Lex being poisoned—and he felt that Glover's suggestion would help them pull off the effect they wanted.

Not all of the last minute changes are about adding new situations to an episode. Ken Horton pulled a scene in "Phoenix" before it aired, which involved Chloe informing Lionel that she will no longer help him dig up information on Clark. He then placed it in "Extinction", which he felt was a better location for it given the events that transpired in "Phoenix". Rutger Hauer was supposed to reprise his role as Morgan Edge for the episode "Shattered", but he had a scheduling conflict that prevented him from returning. Instead, the crew hired Patrick Bergin, and had to rewrite the episode to feature a Morgan Edge who had recently undergone plastic surgery to alter his appearance and voice. One of the reasons for casting Bergin is because the two actors have the same build, lending to the realism that these two actors could portray the same character. Scenes involving Allison Mack and Kristin Kreuk were cut from the episode "Memoria"—with the exception of the opening teaser where Lana finds Lex on the balcony and then informing Clark—as the team felt they were inappropriate for the episode, which stood well on just the story arc involving Clark, Lex and Lionel. This also directed the episode into more of a "mothers and sons" feel that departed from the usual "fathers and sons" tone the show had come to use.

Sets and locations
With the show being filmed in the Vancouver area, many local industries will substitute for Smallville and Metropolis businesses. For the scene where Clark buys a car with stolen money in "Exile", the production crew converted a local bank lobby into a dealership showroom. The Vancouver YMCA served as a stand-in for the Smallville Medical Center. The interior scenes of Summerholt Institute were shot in a local train-car washing building, so that they had enough room to create and film the tank of kryptonite solution. The set was found early in the production of season three, but the crew could not find a use for it until then. The exterior shots were filmed at an abandoned building owned by the Sierra Wireless Company. The building was a spare built by Sierra Wireless to accommodate their growing company. The flashback sequences filmed in "Memoria", of a young Lex with his infant brother Julian, were shot underneath the St. George's Preparatory School, on a specially designed set by Rob Maier. St. George's also doubled as Lex's childhood prep school. The LuthorCorp facility was constructed at an active sewage treatment facility in the Vancouver area. David Willson built the LuthorCorp labs inside the facility's hallways.

Because of budget constraints, the production crew will often recycle sets to save money. For instance, the hospital corridor for Smallville Medical Center was transformed into Lex's cell in "Asylum", which was later transformed into the asylum corridor, before finally being morphed into Dr. Teng's laboratory in later episodes. When the production crew could not afford to rent a local night club, with all of the extras they needed, for more than one night they decided to film all of the wide shots—capturing the three hundred plus extras—on the first night. Then, with their remaining funds, they filmed close-ups of the actors with a limit of fifty extras in the background. When scenes in the season three premiere called for Lex to be stranded on a deserted island, instead of traveling to a beach, the crew found a mountain range in Vancouver that had an area in front of the mountain that resembled a beach. The resemblance was close enough that all they needed to do was to bring in some palm trees to complete the aesthetic they were going for. All of the island scenes were shot in one day.

Sometimes the crew cannot get around the creation of a new set, or traveling to a remote location to film scenes for an episode. For instance, the Luthor mansion set was expanded this season. The production crew first began by expanding the second level in Lex's office, and then exposed the staircase leading up to the second level – it had originally been hidden by a wall. They also added a skylight and inserted lights in the background, giving the room a larger appearance. For scenes in "Legacy" that involved Dr. Swann, the crew traveled with Christopher Reeve to the New York Public Library to film, which was easier for him to journey to. Reeve's schedule forced the production crew to shoot his scenes a month before the script for the episode was finalized. In season two, the crew was able to use the set of NBC's Third Watch, courtesy of John Wells, to film Reeve's scenes. The opening segment for "Truth" where Chloe questions a former co-worker of her father's about why her father was blacklisted by Lionel Luthor, had to be filmed over two nights; the crew ran out of time the first night because of the weather, so they filmed Mack's scenes in front of the studio.

Effects

Physical effects
Effects are an important element in the production of most episodes, and sometimes those effects must be performed practically. One of the largest stunts for the season was performed in "Exile", where two stunt men were dropped from 300 feet down to eight feet above the ground. The effect was used for the scene where Jonathan and Clark are fighting and fall from Lionel's office at LuthorCorp. Producer Bob Hargrove petitioned for the scene to be shot with real stuntmen, as opposed to using computer-generated effects, which was an idea that was being tossed around at the time of filming. During another fight scene, Kim Chang and Lorelei Connelly stepped in for Allison Mack and Kristin Kreuk for where Lana and Chloe get into a fight at school. The scene took two full days of shooting to complete, and involved many different angles to be shot. Close-ups of Mack and Kreuk were filmed of them fighting up to the point that a big fall would take place, and then Chang and Connelly would shoot the same actions from a further distance away and continue through the fall. Then, Mack would continue the fight scene with Chang, where they filmed just Allison Mack's side of the fight. As Mack tumbled over Chang filming would stop, with everyone frozen in their place, and Kreuk would replace Chang in the scene and filming would resume.

Although there are stunt people on the sets for each episode, the cast is more than willing to take on some of the stunt-work themselves. Welling and Schneider performed a lot of their own stunts for the scene where Clark and Jonathan, who now has the powers to take on his son, battle over Clark's use of the red kryptonite in "Exile". This lent to the filmmakers being able to show more of the two actor's faces during the scene, which also lends more realism to the audience. As part of the opening scene for "Extinction", which involved Lana being attacked in the school pool, Kreuk spent thirteen hours in the water as they filmed the scene.

Digital effects
When a practical effect cannot be accomplished, the crew turns to Entity FX to create digital imagery for a given scene. Sometimes this imagery is to substitute action sequences that they cannot do on-site, and other times it is used to create subtle foreground or background effects. For instance, a matte painting is used to establish the Metropolis background, which is composed of buildings from several modern-day cities in addition to Vancouver; they include Singapore and Hong Kong among others. For the scene where Clark rips his shirt open in the phone booth, revealing the tattoo, visual effects were added to the tattoo illuminating it. But in order to add the effects, the middle pane of glass was removed from the phone booth so that the special effects team had a clear line to Welling's chest; they re-added the middle pane digitally, adding reflections so that it looked natural.

For the end of "Exile", Joey Bratazani and Brian Harding worked on the computer effects shots of the Kryptonian tattoo, which was burned into Clark's chest at the end of season two, disappearing at the end of Clark's fight with Jonathan. John Wash describes the effect as being similar to a time-lapse, where you would watch a flower grow, but in the reverse. Bratazani and Harding had to track the effect to Welling's chest, in order for it to look like his skin was really being burned from underneath; otherwise, the shot would have appeared to be just a 2-dimensional light being broadcast on his chest. Just like the Krpytonian tattoo was something created digitally in season two, so was the digital body duplication of Ian Randall, which the special effects team had the chance to work on for a second time in season three's "Asylum". For "Asylum", special effects coordinator Mat Beck and his team used 3-dimensional strands for Ian's separation, which gave the team more control, as well as make the strands appear "gooier and grosser". The original effect in season two consisted of Entity FX using a primary shot of a CGI face pushing its way through a CGI back in three dimensions. This time, the team used a two dimensional shot appearing on a wall—known as "shadow play"—as though the audience is seeing Ian's shadow as he splits himself; lastly, the team applied another two dimensional effect to the final moment of separation, when strands of CGI flesh snap back to each body.

The refusal by the film department to allow Smallville to show Jor-El forced the special effects crew to come up with a creative way to display some sort of aid to help the audience visualize this disembodied voice that was supposed to be talking to Jonathan in "Exile". They decided to create a force field around whoever was speaking to Jor-El, which acted as Jor-El's voice, rippling as he spoke. To save money on this effect, the crew filmed John Schneider on a black backdrop, and Entity FX digitally added the force field around him. Wind machines and a spot light were added to help synthesize the atmosphere in the force field. Another aspect of the Superman mythology appeared in season three's "Hereafter", and was also created digitally: Superman's cape. In the scene, Clark is touched by a boy who sees the moment of someone's death; when he touches Clark he does not see Clark's death but a cape flapping in the wind. Instead of just shooting a practical cape billowing, the scene was developed entirely by a computer. Created primarily by John Hahn, the idea was to show the cape but not so clearly that it would be obvious to the audience what they were looking at. As Beck explains, "You get a hint of the 'S', but not quite."

A scene in the episode "Crisis", where Adam Knight returns and subsequently shoots Lana in an alley, resulted in Entity FX doing more special effects work on a single scene than is typically performed. To make sure the computer-generated effects matched the set the actors were filming on, Mat Beck left his office in Los Angeles and travelled to the Smallville set to work alongside John Wash and John Hahn in constructing the scene. Producer Ken Horton wanted to be able to see the bullet travelling through each of the raindrops as it made its way toward Lana. To accomplish this, the team made the digital bullet larger than normal for better visibility. While filming, a flash zoom was created that would track around Kreuk as she was running, achieving the effect of watching the bullet get fired from the gun, fly through the raindrops, and then as the camera rotates around you see the bullet just as it about to hit Lana before Clark runs in and stops it. This moment in the scene is done in a freeze-frame shot, and the moment Clark stops the bullet everything returns to real time.

The alley scene had to use a lot of computer-generated imagery to accomplish the look that the team needed. The entire alley had to be tracked by the computer in order to make sure that the digital raindrops hit all the objects in the frame, including dumpsters that were visible. In order to achieve the effect of time freezing around Lana just as she is about to get shot and fall to the ground, Kristin Kreuk had to lean against a structural support and hold her body still while filming. Beck and his team had to digitally remove the support from Kreuk, as well as the lower half of her body. They inserted a computer-generated lower half, as well as some hair trailing behind her in order to show that she was in the process of running when time stopped. As time returned to normal, what the audience sees is a completely computer-generated body fall out of frame, as only Lana's lower half is in frame when time returns to normal.

In another instance involving bullets, Entity FX had the job of digitally creating kryptonite bullets, which were fired at Clark in the episode "Extinction". John Wash and his team discussed ways to make the kryptonite bullets unique in their own right, so they decided that since the bullets were made of kryptonite that they might have some kind of reaction to the atmosphere as they flew through it. The computer effects team then created a "green aura, with a little plasma envelope around the bullet" as it flew through the frame, in slow-motion, toward Clark.

Entity FX also had to create the first instance of Clark's super hearing, an ability he acquires in the episode "Whisper". As Beck describes the task: "When you talk about someone flying, it’s something we all know, but this is super hearing and we need to see a visual for the hearing." For the effect of showing Clark using his super hearing, Mat Beck and Entity FX decided that they wanted to travel into Clark's ear and see all the different parts of his eardrum working together to create the sound he is hearing. The task proved difficult to achieve, and Beck asserts that changes will be made to perfect the look of Clark using his super hearing. Clark's super hearing was originally to be revealed early in the season, but when The WB informed the Smallville team that Tarzan, the main character in the studio's update of the classic legend, also had super hearing the team decided to delay the introduction so that the ability could be used in a manner that surpassed what was shown on Tarzan. Luckily for Smallville, The WB's Tarzan was canceled before "Whisper" aired, allowing Smallville to be the only show on the network with a character who has superhuman hearing.

Tie-ins
Season three saw the second volume of Smallville: Chloe Chronicles get released. After the first volume received positive responses from viewers, the second volume was created as a continuation, but with Sam Jones III appearing as Pete Ross alongside Allison Mack as Chloe. This volume used the Smallville comic books as a secondary tie-in to the series. Viewers could watch Smallville, followed by Chloe's Chronicles, and finish with the Smallville comic book, which would provide an "enhanced backstory to the online segments". Additionally, the Smallville producers teamed up with Verizon to provide its registered users the chance to view plot updates—in the form of a press release from The Daily Planet—as well as quizzes and games related to the show. As part of the deal, Verizon products and services were placed in various episodes of the show.

Awards
In 2004, the show was nominated for a Golden Reel Award for Best Sound Editing in "Exile". The series was recognized by the Visual Effects Society with a 2005 VES Award nomination for Outstanding Compositing for the episode "Crisis". The DVD release of season three won the Saturn Award for Best DVD Television Release.

Home media release 
The complete third season of Smallville was released on November 16, 2004, in North America. Additional releases in region 2 and region 4 took place on April 18, 2005, and July 18, 2005, respectively. The DVD box set included various special features, including episode commentary, The Chloe Chronicles: Volume II, a behind-the-scenes featurette on how they produce the series, and DVD-ROM linking to Smallville websites.

References

External links

 
 
 List of Smallville season 3 episodes at Wikia
 
 List of Smallville season 3 guide at kryptonsite.com

3
2003 American television seasons
2004 American television seasons